The 2021 IFAGG World Cup series in Aesthetic Group Gymnastics is a series of competitions officially organized and promoted by the International Federation of Aesthetic Group Gymnastics.

Formats

Medal winners

World Cup

Challenge Cup

Overall medal table

External links
IFAGG Competition calendar 2021

Aesthetic Group Gymnastics World Cup
2021 in gymnastics